Bucynthia spiloptera is a species of beetle in the family Cerambycidae. It was described by Pascoe in 1863. It is known from Australia.

Subspecies
 Bucynthia spiloptera fuscobrunnea Aurivillius, 1893
 Bucynthia spiloptera spiloptera (Pascoe, 1863)

References

Desmiphorini
Beetles described in 1863